Cache Valley Mall is a shopping mall located in Logan, Utah that opened in 1976. The mall has no anchors, with three vacant anchors last occupied by C-A-L Ranch, Herberger's and JCPenney. The mall is owned by Namdar Realty Group.

History 
The mall was in planning as early as 1972, when the Logan City Commission refused to rezone land for the mall, leading to the developers bringing a lawsuit against the commission. Plans re-emerged in 1974, with developers John Price Associates announcing it as a 300,000 square foot mall to include 3 department store anchors, a supermarket, a bank, and "dozens" of small businesses, with an opening date sometime in 1976. Construction had begun by 1975, with anchors JCPenney, ZCMI, and Ernst-Malmo (later specified as Ernst Home Center) announced at this time. An opening of late July 1976 was announced by February that year, with additional tenants including Logan Savings and Loan, Karmelkorn, Kinney Shoes, and J.B.'s Big Boy. A 14-year-old girl was shot in the chest on the mall property on July 19, 1976, before recovering.

The Ernst Home Center opened for business before the mall on July 20, 1976. The mall proper opened on July 29, 1976, with anchors Ernst Home Center (37,000 sq ft), ZCMI (61,000 sq ft), and JCPenney (47,000 sq ft) along with a supermarket, a drug store, a First Security Bank, and an outparcel 3-screen Mann Theatre. In 1988, the Bon Marche (formerly Ernst Home Center) at the mall was bought by and converted to Lamonts. The Cache Valley 3 Theatre was converted to a Carmike Cinemas in 1995. ZCMI was sold to The May Department Stores Company in 1999, with the store at the mall being sold to Dillard's in 2001. Lamonts was sold to Gottschalks in 2000, before closing in 2001. The store was later replaced by Dillard's Home Store. The Cache Valley 3 Theatre was converted to its final operator, Westates Theatres, in February 2002, before closing on October 18, 2007.

In January 2013 it was announced that both Dillard's locations would close, citing under-performance. Herberger's opened at the mall in early 2014, their first location in Utah, in the former Dillard's space. C-A-L Ranch opened at the mall in the former Dillard's Home Store space in 2015. The mall was sold from Rouse Properties to Namdar Realty Group in December 2017. Herberger's closed at the mall in 2018, in a round of 42 store closures prior to bankruptcy later that year. In 2019, the former Cache Valley Mall 3 Theatres building underwent heavy renovations to become two restaurants and an event center, with a projected opening date of Spring 2020. On June 4, 2020, JCPenney announced that it would be closing as part of a plan to close 154 stores nationwide. The store closed on October 18, 2020. On January 22, 2021, it was announced that C-A-L Ranch would be relocating to the former Kmart space in North Logan in Spring 2021 which will leave the mall with no anchors left.

References

External links 

 

Buildings and structures in Logan, Utah
Shopping malls in Utah
Shopping malls established in 1976
Namdar Realty Group